Jeremy Scahill (born October 18, 1974) is an American investigative journalist, writer, a founding editor of the online news publication The Intercept, and author of Blackwater: The Rise of the World's Most Powerful Mercenary Army, which won the George Polk Book Award. His book Dirty Wars: The World Is a Battlefield was published by Nation Books on April 23, 2013. On June 8, 2013, the documentary film of the same name, produced, narrated and co-written by Scahill, was released. It premiered at the 2013 Sundance Film Festival.

Scahill is a Fellow at the Type Media Center. Scahill learned journalism and started his career on the independently syndicated daily news show Democracy Now!. He lives in Brooklyn, New York and publishes a podcast titled Intercepted.

Early life
Scahill was born in Chicago, Illinois, and was raised in Wauwatosa, Wisconsin, a suburb of Milwaukee, by "social activist" parents, Lisa and Michael Scahill, both nurses. He graduated from Wauwatosa East High School in 1992.

Jeremy attended a few University of Wisconsin regional campuses and a local technical college before deciding that his "time would be better spent by entering the struggle for justice in this country." After dropping out of college, Scahill spent several years on the East Coast working in homeless shelters. He started his career as an unpaid intern at the nonprofit news program Democracy Now! of the Pacifica Radio network. While he was at Democracy Now!, Scahill learned the technical side of radio, and learned "journalism as a trade, rather than an academic study".

Discussing the roots of his activism, Scahill said: "I think we all have to remember something that Dan Berrigan, the radical Catholic priest, said about Dorothy Day, founder of the Catholic Worker movement. He said she lived as though the truth were true." And: "Victory is relative when you listen to the powerful. But we have a victory in our midst, because the entire world is on our side. So I say that we call for an end to the death penalty in this country, and we call for an end to the collective death penalty being meted out on the rest of the world by this criminal government."

He also worked in 2000 as a producer for Michael Moore's TV series The Awful Truth on Bravo.

Journalism career
Scahill became a senior producer and correspondent for Democracy Now! and remains a frequent contributor. Scahill and his Democracy Now! colleague Amy Goodman were co-recipients of the 1998 George Polk Award for their radio documentary "Drilling and Killing: Chevron and Nigeria's Oil Dictatorship", which investigated the Chevron Corporation's role in the killing of two Nigerian environmental activists.

In 1998, Scahill traveled to Iraq for Democracy Now! and Pacifica Radio, where he reported on the impact of the economic sanctions on Iraq and the "No-Fly Zone" bombings in Northern and Southern Iraq. An article in AlterNet has described Jeremy Scahill as a "progressive journalist".

In October 2013 Scahill joined with reporters Glenn Greenwald and Laura Poitras to establish an on-line investigative journalism publishing venture funded by eBay billionaire Pierre Omidyar. The idea for the new media outlet came from Omidyar's "concern about press freedoms in the US and around the world". The Intercept, a publication of First Look Media, went live on February 10, 2014. The short-term goal of the digital magazine is to publish reports about information contained in documents disclosed by Edward Snowden concerning the NSA. According to editors Greenwald, Poitras, and Scahill, their "longer-term mission is to provide aggressive and independent adversarial journalism across a wide range of issues, from secrecy, criminal and civil justice abuses and civil liberties violations to media conduct, societal inequality and all forms of financial and political corruption."

On November 30, 2013, Scahill refused to participate in a Stop the War Conference in London unless Syrian nun Mother Agnes was dropped from the symposium. Mother Agnes eventually pulled out. In February 2017, Scahill canceled his appearance on Real Time with Bill Maher after finding out that Milo Yiannopoulos was scheduled to appear on the same day.

Scahill criticized the US government's decision to charge WikiLeaks founder Julian Assange under the Espionage Act of 1917 for his role in the 2010 publication of a trove of Iraq War documents and diplomatic cables. Scahill tweeted: "This is about retaliation for publishing evidence of U.S. war crimes and other crimes by the most powerful nation on Earth. It's a threat to press freedom."

On May 9, 2019, the intelligence analyst Daniel Everette Hale was arrested for leaking classified information to a reporter. The reporter to whom Hale leaked was not explicitly named, but a book-signing at which they met was identified, and reporters concluded that Hale had leaked to Scahill.

Works

Kosovo conflict

In 1999, he covered the Kosovo conflict, reporting live from Belgrade and Kosovo itself. In an article in the International Socialist Review, Scahill accused the United Nations Mission in Kosovo (UNMIK) of being complicit in Albanian atrocities against Serbs.

After Slobodan Milosevic's death in 2006, Scahill accused the International Criminal Tribunal for the former Yugoslavia (ICTY) of practicing "victors' justice" and being "a poor substitute for a true international court."

War on Terror

Between 2001 and 2003, Scahill reported frequently from Baghdad for Democracy Now! and other media outlets. As the Iraq invasion began, Scahill appeared frequently on Democracy Now!, often co-hosting with Amy Goodman.

Scahill has reported from Afghanistan, Iraq, Somalia, Yemen, the former Yugoslavia, post-Katrina Louisiana, and elsewhere across the globe. Scahill is a frequent guest on many programs, appearing regularly on The Rachel Maddow Show, Real Time with Bill Maher, and Democracy Now! He has also appeared on ABC World News, CBS Evening News, NBC Nightly News, The Daily Show, CNN, The NewsHour, MSNBC, Bill Moyers Journal, and NPR. In addition, Scahill has written for The Times, The Sunday Telegraph, the BBC, The Indypendent, the Los Angeles Times, Z Magazine, Socialist Worker, International Socialist Review, The Progressive, In These Times, and The Guardian.

He has been a vocal critic of private military contractors, particularly Blackwater Worldwide, which is the subject of his book, Blackwater: The Rise of the World's Most Powerful Mercenary Army. The book received numerous accolades, including the Alternet Best Book of the Year Award, a spot on both the Barnes & Noble and Amazon lists of the Best Nonfiction Books of 2007, and notable mention in The New York Times.

Scahill's work has sparked several Congressional investigations. In 2010, Scahill testified before the U.S. House Judiciary Committee on the United States' shadow wars in Pakistan, Yemen, and elsewhere:
As the war rages on in Afghanistan and—despite spin to the contrary—in Iraq as well, US Special Operations Forces and the Central Intelligence Agency are engaged in parallel, covert, shadow wars that are waged in near total darkness and largely away from effective or meaningful Congressional oversight or journalistic scrutiny. The actions and consequences of these wars is seldom discussed in public or investigated by the Congress. The current US strategy can be summed up as follows: We are trying to kill our way to peace. And the killing fields are growing in number.

In July 2011, Scahill revealed the existence of a CIA-run counterterrorism center at the airport in Mogadishu, Somalia, and reported on a previously unknown secret prison located in the basement of the U.S.-funded Somali National Security Agency, in which—according to a U.S. official—U.S. agents interrogated prisoners. 

When the public became aware of President Obama's "Kill List", Scahill was frequently cited as an expert on the topic of extrajudicial killings.
In 2019, he argued that Donald Trump probably represented "the best hope that we've had since 9/11 to end some of these forever wars."

Blackwater
Scahill's first book, The New York Times bestseller Blackwater: The Rise of the World's Most Powerful Mercenary Army, thoroughly revised and updated to include the Nisour Square massacre, was released in paperback edition in 2008. Blackwater depicts the rise of the controversial military contracting firm Blackwater, now called Academi.

Scahill exposed the presence of Blackwater contractors in New Orleans after Hurricane Katrina and his reporting sparked a Congressional inquiry and an internal Department of Homeland Security investigation.

Dirty Wars

Scahill's book Dirty Wars: The World Is a Battlefield was published by Nation Books on April 23, 2013.  The main premise of the book is Obama's continuation of Bush's doctrine that "the world is a battlefield" and relying on missiles and drone strikes, JSOC to carry the bulk of the covert operations and targeted killings of suspected terrorists. Scahill expands on this theme by covering topics such as the assassination of U.S. citizens, namely Anwar Awlaki and his 16-year-old son Abdulrahman Anwar al-Awlaki, and the lack of accountability of U.S. special forces, such as the Gardez massacre, where U.S. special forces killed two males, including the pro-U.S. local police commander, as well as three females, two of whom were pregnant. An Afghan investigation found signs of evidence tampering, such as bullets being removed from the wall where the women were shot. Several family members of the victims alleged that the special forces subsequently used their knives to dig the bullets out of the bodies and cleaned the resultant wounds to purge any evidence of the U.S. raid.

The book was released around the same time as a 2013 American documentary directed by Richard Rowley based on a screenplay written by Scahill and David Riker. Scahill both produced and narrated the film. Dirty Wars premiered at the 2013 Sundance Film Festival on January 18, 2013 and was released in four theaters on June 7, 2013. The film was nominated for the 2014 Academy Award for Best Documentary Feature, ultimately losing to 20 Feet from Stardom.

Abdulelah Haider Shaye
Scahill has been an advocate for imprisoned Yemeni journalist Abdulelah Haider Shaye. Scahill's March 13, 2012 article in The Nation states that President Obama leaned on Yemen to keep Shaye in jail because of his reporting on the 2009 Al Ma'jalah bombings—Shaye described remnants of U.S. Tomahawk missiles, although the United States initially denied involvement. Subsequent English-language reports on the issue have relied on Scahill's journalism.

Awards and recognition 
Scahill has won numerous awards, including the prestigious George Polk Award (twice), numerous Project Censored Awards, and the Izzy Award, named after investigative journalist I. F. Stone. He was among the few Western reporters to gain access to the Abu Ghraib prison when Saddam Hussein was in power and his story on the emptying of that prison won a 2003 Golden Reel Award from The National Federation of Community Broadcasters. In 2013, he was awarded the Windham–Campbell Literature Prize, one of the richest literary awards in the world.

Selected writings
 "Blood Is Thicker Than Blackwater" | This article appeared in the May 8, 2006 edition of The Nation
 "Blackwater's Private Spies" | This article appeared in the June 23, 2008 edition of The Nation
 "Mercenary Jackpot" | This article appeared in the August 28, 2006 edition of The Nation
 "Washington's War in Yemen Backfires" | This article appeared in the March 5–12, 2012 edition of The Nation
 "Blowback in Somalia" | This article appeared in the September 26, 2011 edition of The Nation
 "The CIA's Secret Sites in Somalia" | This article appeared in the August 1–8, 2011 edition of The Nation
 "Osama's Assassins" | This article appeared in the May 23, 2011 edition of The Nation
 The Assassination Complex: Inside the Government's Secret Drone Warfare Program, book by Jeremy Scahill and the staff of The Intercept

References

External links 
 
 
 
 Dirty Wars
 Intercepted podcast
 Jeremy Scahill's page as co-founding editor of The Intercept
 Jeremy Scahill's appearances on Democracy Now!
 Jeremy Scahill's reports at The Guardian
 Jeremy Scahill's reports at HuffPost
 Jeremy Scahill's reports  at AlterNet.org
 Jeremy Scahill's reports at The Nation
 Jeremy Scahill's page as a fellow at The Nation Institute (archived)

American alternative journalists
American investigative journalists
American radio reporters and correspondents
Pacifica Foundation people
American war correspondents
War correspondents of the Iraq War
War correspondents of the Yugoslav Wars
American military writers
American male journalists
George Polk Award recipients
Writers from Milwaukee
1974 births
Living people
People from Chicago
American podcasters